Luz Martinez-Miranda from the University of Maryland, was awarded the status of Fellow in the American Physical Society, after she was nominated by the Forum on Education in 2007, for sustained achievements in recruiting, mentoring, and advancing women and minorities in physics; for engaging K-16 students in the excitement of research; and for being a superb role model through her elegant research to understand liquid crystal systems and further their application. Her bachelors and masters are from the University of Puerto Rico in physics. She graduated with her Ph.D. in 1985 from Massachusetts Institute of Technology (MIT). She is an undergraduate advisor for the Materials Science and Engineering Department at the University of Maryland. She researches the interaction of liquid crystal with nanoscale materials for engineering and biological applications.

Professional Memberships 

 American Ceramic Society
 American Physical Society (APS)
 American Society for the Advancement of Science (AAAS)
 NSHP (National Society for Hispanic Physicists)
 SACNAS (the Society for the Advancement of Chicanos and Native Americans in Science)

Awards and honors 

 Fellow, American Physical Society (APS), 2007
 Visiting Faculty Appointment to the Centre de Recherche Paul Pascal, 2006
 Fellow, American Society for the Advancement of Science (AAAS), 2004
 Boricua College Professional Achievement Award in Science, 2004
 NSF Career Advancement Award, 1997
 W.M. Keck Foundation, Engineering Excellence Teaching Award, 1995
 Fellow, American Ceramic Society, 1994
 NSF Visiting Professorship for Women, 1994-1996.

References 

Fellows of the American Physical Society
21st-century American physicists
21st-century American women scientists
American women physicists
Living people
Year of birth missing (living people)